Abdollah Noori is an Iranian cleric and reformist politician. Despite his "long history of service to the Islamic Republic," he became the most senior Islamic politician to be sentenced to prison since the Iranian Revolution, when he was sentenced to five years in prison for political and religious dissent in 1999. He has been called the "bête noire" of Islamic conservatives in Iran.

Noori is a senior member of Association of Combatant Clerics, and also close ally of the Executives of Construction Party.

Career
Abdollah Nouri was called a "trusted lieutenant" of Ayatollah Khomeini who was "the religious guide to the Revolutionary Guards early in the revolution." Khomeini appointed him as his representative to many other important organisations as well. Khomeini's successor, supreme leader, Ayatollah Ali Khamenei, also appointed him a member "of a powerful council which advises him on major policies". However, Abdollah Nouri also supported dissident cleric, Grand Ayatollah Hossein-Ali Montazeri, who was placed under house arrest in 1997 for questioning the authority of Ayatollah Khamenei.

Nouri served as minister of interior for four years in then-President Hashemi Rafsanjani's first term cabinet. He also served as the minister of interior in Mohammad Khatami's first term cabinet until his impeachment by the conservative-controlled 5th Majlis for his "defence of political and social freedoms." Following his impeachment, Khatami brought Abdullah Nouri back to his cabinet as a vice-president. He was "generally seen as the most outspoken reformist" in Khatami's cabinet.

In February 1999, he stood down from this post to take part in the municipal elections in February and was elected as the chief of the City Council of Tehran.

He resigned from the Council in order to participate in the sixth parliamentary election. He founded a newspaper and named it Khordad, named after the victory of President Khatami on the 2nd of Khordad, 1376 by the Iranian calendar, equivalent to 23 May 1997. His newspaper advocated "freedom of expression, human rights and a modern and democratic Islam."

Trial
Based on the contents of this newspaper, Nouri was accused of insulting Islamic values by pushing for democratic reforms, dishonoring Imam Ruhollah Khomeini's memory by questioning the authority of the Supreme Leader. According to a Western journalist, another explanation for his prosecution was that Nouri was very popular in Tehran and "the odds on favorite to become Speaker of Parliament in the February 2000 Parliamentary election," something imprisonment would prevent.

He was tried by the Special Clerical Court in Iran and made an "outspoken and aggressive defense during his trial", refusing to accept the authority of this court, which he saw as unconstitutional.

On 27 November 1999, he was convicted of insulting Ayatollah Khomeini, publishing anti-religious materials, disturbing public opinion, insulting officials, advocating links with the United States and was sentenced to five years in jail.

Readers of the Iranian voted him the most significant Iranian personality of 1999.

Release
Nouri was released from prison on 5 November 2002. He was released because his brother Alireza Noori, a member of parliament at the time, was killed in an accident. Noori was freed from Evin Prison when Mehdi Karroubi, speaker of the Majlis at the time, wrote a letter to the Supreme Leader and asked him to free Noori as his father was suffering from the loss of his other son.

Abdollah Nouri was mentioned as a possible candidate in the 2009 presidential election, but did not run.

Analysis
He is considered as one of the leading pragmatists among reformers, though his policies were aligned with Khomeini’s doctrines.

References

External links
 Nouri banned from Iranian election

1950 births
Living people
Amnesty International prisoners of conscience held by Iran
Government ministers of Iran
Iranian reformists
Members of the Expediency Discernment Council
Iranian Shia clerics
Association of Combatant Clerics politicians
Tehran Councillors 1999–2003
Chairmen of City Council of Tehran
Iranian newspaper publishers (people)
Heads of reformist fractions in Islamic Consultative Assembly
Iranian prisoners and detainees
Executives of Construction Party politicians
Members of the 2nd Islamic Consultative Assembly
Members of the 5th Islamic Consultative Assembly
Impeached Iranian officials removed from office
Iranian politicians convicted of crimes
Vice presidents of Iran
Islamic Revolutionary Guard Corps clerics